Strathmore Football Club is an Australian rules football club located 7 km north west of Melbourne in the suburb of Strathmore and was founded in 1954 as a junior club.

The senior club was established in 1957.

The club originally played its home games in Pascoe Vale before moving to its current home at Lebanon Reserve in Strathmore.

The club won its seventh A Grade Premiership in 2011 with a win over rivals Oak Park. Strathmore came into the game underdogs after losing the semi final to Oak Park by 37 points. However, Strathmore prevailed; the final scores were Oak Park 11.13 (79) def. by Strathmore 11.15 (81).

The club was awarded its ninth premiership in 2021 by the EDFL as the ladder leader when the season was curtailed due to the effects of the COVID-19 pandemic.

VFL/AFL players recruited from Strathmore 
 Glenn Manton – Essendon and Carlton
 Andrew Horne – South Adelaide Panthers
 Steven Clark – Essendon, Melbourne and St Kilda
 Ed Considine – Essendon
 Mark Eustice – Essendon
 Darryl Gerlach – Essendon
 Geoff Gosper – Essendon
 Russell Muir – Essendon
 Michael Thomson – Essendon
 Ian Aitken – Carlton
 Jeff Chandler – North Melbourne
 Adam Contessa – Western Bulldogs
 Lance Picioane – North Melbourne and Hawthorn
 Scott West – Western Bulldogs
 Jackson Trengove – Port Adelaide
 Ryan O'Keefe – Sydney
 Brian Wilson – Collingwood
 James Polkinghorne – Brisbane Lions
 Andrew Johnston – Fitzroy Football Club

References 

 Full Points Footy
 EDFL website

Essendon District Football League clubs
1954 establishments in Australia
Australian rules football clubs established in 1954
Australian rules football clubs in Melbourne
Sport in the City of Moonee Valley